Leeds United Football Club Under-21s is the most senior of Leeds United's youth teams and the club's former reserve team. As of the 2022–23 season, they play in the Premier League 2 Division 2, the second tier of the Professional Development League, following relegation from Division 1 in 2021–2022. The team host most of their home games at the club's Thorp Arch training complex, with some matches also taking place at Elland Road.

The under-23s replaced the club's under-21 team in 2016, which had replaced the reserve team in 2012 following the English game's reform of the youth football and the introduction of the Elite Player Performance Plan. The club was initially awarded Category Two status but upgraded to Category One in 2020. The team is currently managed by Paco Gallardo and competes in the Premier League 2 and the Football League Trophy.

Leeds United Football Club Under-18s are the academy's junior side and compete in the U18 Premier League and the FA Youth Cup. The team is managed by another former Academy graduate Scott Gardner.

The academy itself is overseen by Manager Adam Underwood, who joined the club in 2017 and helped to secure Category One status three years later.

The Leeds United u23's team won the PDL Cup in 2019 after beating Birmingham City u23's at Elland Road after a tense penalty shootout.

Current players
For the 2022–23 season onwards, player eligibility is restricted to under-21 players  (reduced from under-23) born after 1 January 2001. To help with the transition, teams were allowed up to five over-age outfield players (up from three) and one over-age goalkeeper. Only players born after 1 January 2004 (primarily scholars), are eligible to play for the Under 18s. Italics denotes player has received a call up to the squad but did not or has yet to receive a cap at that level.

Graduates
The following list includes players who have graduated from Leeds' youth system to make their senior debut for the first team. Players who have represented their national team at senior level are highlighted in bold.

 Harry Kewell
 Jamie McMaster
 Kun Temenuzhkov
 Tomi Ameobi
 Neil Aspin
 Lewis Bate
 Mick Bates
 David Batty
 Rod Belfitt
 Jason Blunt
 Rob Bowman
 Aiden Butterworth
 Sam Byram
 Alex Cairns
 Scott Carson
 Oliver Casey
 Jack Charlton
 Jack Clarke
 Terry Connor
 Lewis Cook
 Terry Cooper
 Andy Couzens
 Lewie Coyle
 Charlie Cresswell
 Leif Davis
 Fabian Delph
 Tyler Denton
 Cody Drameh
 Ryan Edmondson
 Tom Elliott
 Gareth Evans
 Mark Ford
 Jamie Forrester
 Scott Gardner
 Joe Gelhardt
 Robbie Gotts
 Simon Grayson
 Jimmy Greenhoff
 Sam Greenwood 
 Tony Hackworth
 Grenville Hair
 Peter Hampton
 Terry Hibbitt
 Jonny Howson
 Will Huffer 
 Norman Hunter
 Mark Jackson
 Jack Jenkins
 Simon Johnson 
 Matthew Kilgallon 
 Tom Lees 
 Aaron Lennon
 John Lukic
 Paul Madeley
 Lee Matthews 
 James Milner
 Alex Mowatt 
 Ben Parker  
 Tom Pearce 
 Sonny Perkins
 Kalvin Phillips
 Dominic Poleon 
 Paul Robinson
 Paul Reaney
 Frazer Richardson 
 Scott Sellars
 Jamie Shackleton
 Kevin Sharp
 Paul Shepherd
 Alan Smith
 Peter Swan
 Charlie Taylor
 Mark Tinkler
 Ronaldo Vieira
 Simon Walton
 Noel Whelan
 Mallik Wilks 
 Jonathan Woodgate
 Clarke Oduor
 Pascal Struijk
 Crysencio Summerville
 Wesley Boyle
 Alfie McCalmont
 Bailey Peacock-Farrell
 Leo Hjelde
 Tommy Knarvik
 Robert Bayly
 Ian Harte
 Denis Irwin
 Gary Kelly
 Andy Keogh
 Simon Madden
 Alan Maybury
 Stephen McPhail
 Terry Phelan
 John Sheridan
 Eoghan Stokes
 Aidy White
 Billy Bremner
 Andy Gray
 Eddie Gray
 Frank Gray
 David Harvey
 Peter Lorimer
 Liam McCarron
 Stuart McKinstry
 Martin Woods
 Tommy Wright
 Mateo Joseph
 John Charles
 Chris Dawson
 Neil Edwards
 Carl Harris
 Niall Huggins
 Matthew Jones
 Gary Speed
 Gary Sprake
 Byron Stevenson
 Terry Yorath

Other Professionals

 Adam Berry
 Shane Cansdell-Sherriff
 Bobby Kamwa
 Daniel Batty
 James Baxendale
 David Brown
 Liam Darville
 Kevin Dixon
 Matty Edwards
 Josh Falkingham
 Craig Farrell
 Martin Foster
 Luke Garbutt
 Ben Gordon
 Will Hatfield
 Sean Hessey
 Sam Hird
 Elliot Kebbie
 Liam Kitching
 Nathan Lowndes
 Tom Newey
 Paul Pettinger
 Jamie Price
 Danny Rose
 Neil Ross
 Gavin Rothery
 John Scales
 David Seaman
 Harpal Singh
 Matthew Smithard
 George Swan
 Tom Taiwo
 James Tavernier
 Danny Ward
 Michael Woods
 Adam Priestley
 Romario Vieira
 Warren Feeney
 Alan Cawley
 Barry Corr
 Caleb Folan
 Paul Keegan
 Damian Lynch
 Henry McStay
 Ian Morris
 Tom Cairney
 Oli McBurnie
 Andrew Milne
 Kevin Smith
 Jamie Winter
 Chad Harpur
 Max McMillan
 Kevin Aherne-Evans
 Lawrence Davies
 Ryan Nicholls
 Craig Stiens
 Ethan Kachosa

Honours

Reserves
League
The Central League (Tier 1)
Winners (2): 1936–37, 1997–98
The Central League, Division One East (Tier 2)
Winners (2): 2008–09, 2009–10
Cup
West Riding Senior Cup
Winners (2): 1926–27, 1963–64

Under 23s
League
Premier League 2 Division 2 Champions (1): 2020–21
Professional Development League National Champions (1): 2018–19
Professional Development League North Division Champions (1): 2018–19

Under 18s
League
U18 Professional Development League North Division Champions (1): 2012–13
U18 Professional Development League North Division Champions (1): 2017–18
Cup
FA Youth Cup
Winners (2): 1992–93, 1996–97

Under 17s
League
FA Premier Academy League (Tier 1)
Winners (1): 2002–03
Cup
Milk Cup
Winners (1): 2002

Academy Coaching Staff

|}

Academy Directors

Development Squad

Reserves

Under 19s & 17s and 18s & 16s

References

External links
Official Leeds United F.C. website - Reserve Player Profiles
Official Leeds United F.C. website - Academy Player Profiles

Reserves And Youth Team
Football academies in England